Xenofon Moschogiannis (born 21 January 1977) is a retired Greek footballer defender.

Career
Born in Pyrgos, Elis, Moschogiannis began playing professional football with Paniliakos F.C. Moschogiannis would play in the Greek Super League with OFI Crete, Kerkyra FC and Asteras Tripolis. He finished his career with Ethnikos Piraeus, initially on loan from Asteras Tripolis of the Greek Super League.

References

External links
Profile at EPAE.org

1977 births
Living people
Greek footballers
Paniliakos F.C. players
Ethnikos Piraeus F.C. players
A.O. Kerkyra players
OFI Crete F.C. players
Asteras Tripolis F.C. players
Association football defenders
Footballers from Pyrgos, Elis